The 12691 / 92 Chennai Central–Sri Sathya Sai Prashanthi Nilayam Express is an Express train belonging to Indian Railways Southern Railway zone that runs between Chennai Central and Sri Sathya Sai Prashanthi Nilayam in India.

It operates as train number 12691 from Chennai Central to Sri Sathya Sai Prashanthi Nilayam and as train number 12692 in the reverse direction, serving the states of  Tamil Nadu, Karnataka & Andhra Pradesh.

 Genera

Service

Routing
The 12691 / 92 Chennai Central–Sri Sathya Sai Prashanthi Nilayam Superfast Express runs from Chennai Central via ,Sholinghur, ,Ambur, Krantivira Sangolli Rayanna Bengaluru Station to Sri Sathya Sai Prashanthi Nilayam.

Coach composition

The train has standard LHB rakes with max speed of 190 kmph.

 1 AC First Class
 3 AC II Tier
 3 AC III Tier
 11 Sleeper coaches
 2 General
 1 PC Pantry car
 2 End On Generator van

Traction
As the route is electrified, a Royapuram-based WAP-7 electric loco pulls the train to its destination.

Rake sharing

12669/12670 – Ganga Kaveri Express

Reversals 

Train reverses at Krantivira Sangolli Rayanna Bengaluru station

References

External links
12691 Chennai Central-Sathya Sai Prasanthi Nilayam Express at India Rail Info
12692 Sathya Sai Prasanthi Nilayam-Chennai Central Express at India Rail Info

Express trains in India
Transport in Chennai
Rail transport in Tamil Nadu
Rail transport in Karnataka
Rail transport in Andhra Pradesh